Here's Duffy was a Canadian variety television series which aired on CBC Television from 1958 to 1959.

Premise
Singer and comedian Jack Duffy hosted this series with regular performers such as singing quartet The Crescendoes, comedy performer Jill Foster and an orchestra under the direction of Eddie Karam. Salada tea was the show's sponsor. Larry D. Mann also appeared on the series.

Scheduling
This half-hour series began as a mid-year replacement on Saturdays at 10:30 p.m. from 21 June to 20 September 1958. It was then given a full season on Fridays at 8:00 p.m. from 3 October 1958 to 31 January 1959, shifting to Thursday at 10:30 p.m. from 5 February to 25 June 1959. After this final season run, one later episode was scheduled on 10 October 1959.

References

External links
 
 

CBC Television original programming
1950s Canadian variety television series
1958 Canadian television series debuts
1959 Canadian television series endings
Black-and-white Canadian television shows